Robert Menzies was the longest-serving prime minister of Australia. 

Robert Menzies may also refer to:
 Robert Stewart Menzies (1856–1889), Scottish Liberal politician
 Robert Menzies (cricketer) (1916–1983), Australian-born New Zealand cricketer
 Robert Menzies (British Army officer) (born 1944)
 Robert Menzies (water polo) (born 1946), Australian Olympic water polo player
 Robert Menzies (actor) (born 1955), Australian television actor
 Robert Menzies College, a residential college of Macquarie University

See also
 Menzies (disambiguation)
 Robert Menzies Mitchell (1865–1932)